Awang Ahmad Sah bin Awang Sahari is a Malaysian politician who has served as Member of the Sabah State Legislative Assembly (MLA) for Petagas since September 2020. He is a member of the Parti Gagasan Rakyat Sabah (GAGASAN), a component party of the Gabungan Rakyat Sabah (GRS) coalition and was a member of the Heritage Party (WARISAN) and Homeland Solidarity Party (STAR). He was the Treasurer and Division Chief of Putatan of WARISAN and Deputy Chairman of STAR. He is also brother of Vice President of the People's Justice Party (PKR) and former Member of Parliament (MP) for Putatan Awang Husaini Sahari. 

On 27 February 2023, Awang Ahmad Sah left WARISAN for GAGASAN, becoming the 10th WARISAN MLA to leave the party since the 2020 Sabah state election.

Education 
He studied in the Buit Hill Primary School and in the Sabah College. He is a Bachelor of Arts in Political Science from Hawaii Pacific University, Master of Arts in Political Science and Master of Science in Agriculture Economics from Southern Illinois University Carbondale.

Election results

Honours 

  :
  Commander of the Order of Kinabalu (PGDK) - Datuk (2019)

References 

21st-century Malaysian politicians
Malaysian Muslims
Place of birth missing (living people)
Hawaii Pacific University alumni
Southern Illinois University Carbondale alumni
Homeland Solidarity Party politicians
Sabah Heritage Party politicians
Members of the Sabah State Legislative Assembly
Malaysian people of Malay descent
Living people
1959 births
Commanders of the Order of Kinabalu